The men's 400 metres event at the 1959 Summer Universiade was held at the Stadio Comunale di Torino in Turin with the final on 3, 4 and 5 September 1959.

Medalists

Results

Heats

Semifinals

Final

References

Athletics at the 1959 Summer Universiade
1959